CARC may refer to:

 CARC (Kingston University), the Contemporary Art Research Centre at Kingston University
 CARC Party, a far-left extra-parliamentary political party in Italy
 Chemical Agent Resistant Coating, paint commonly applied to military vehicles which provides protection against chemical and biological weapons
 Civil Aviation Regulatory Committee, the decision-making body of the Canadian Aviation Regulation Advisory Council
 Club Atlético Rosario Central, an Argentinian sports club
 Clydesdale Amateur Rowing Club, Glasgow, Scotland
 2-hydroxy-6-oxo-6-(2-aminophenyl)hexa-2,4-dienoate hydrolase (CarC), an enzyme
 Carc, a raven character in The Hobbit
 CARC system (Cardano Reattivo Compatto), introduced by Italian motorcycle manufacturer Moto Guzzi

See also
 Philippine Science High School Cordillera Administrative Region Campus (PSHS-CARC)